The Women's 4 × 100 metre freestyle relay competition at the 2017 World Championships will be held on 23 July 2017.

Records
Prior to the competition, the existing world and championship records were as follows.

Results

Heats
The heats were held at 11:39.

Final
The final was held at 19:03.

References

Women's 4 x 100 metre freestyle relay
2017 in women's swimming